The Socialist Justice Party (RS) is a Trotskyist political party in Sweden. RS is the Swedish section of International Socialist Alternative (ISA).
The forerunner organization of RS was called Arbetarförbundet Offensiv (Workers' League - Offensive). The group developed out of the Offensiv group that had practiced entryism in the Swedish Social Democratic Party during the 1970s and 1980s.

Ahead of the 2010 elections internal divisiveness resulted in the Västerbotten faction forming its own party, which adopted the name the Workers' Party in 2011.

History

The group who were later to start Offensiv were students at Umeå University and members of Swedish Social Democratic Youth League (SSU, Sveriges Socialdemokratiska Ungdomsförbund: the youth organisation of the Swedish Social Democratic Party). At the 1972 SSU conference, two members of this group; Anders Hjelm and Arne Johansson; met representatives of the Labour Party Young Socialists in Britain, where supporters of the left wing Militant had won control of that organisation, and began discussing with them. As Arne Johansson puts it "One conclusion of the discussions with the British Trotskyists was that we should start publishing a paper as a rallying point for a Marxist left within the labour movement, something we then did ahead of the election in 1973".

In the early 1980s SSU initiated expulsions against young socialists associated with Arbetarförbundet Offensiv and their newspaper, named Offensiv. Activists of Offensiv defined these expulsions as witchhunts arranged by the right-wing leadership of SSU. On the other hand, the leadership of SSU saw the Offensiv-tendency as an ambition to carry out a communist take-over of SSU.

In the early 1990s, Arbetarförbundet Offensiv started to relinquish their former tactics of entryism into other movements. The organisation also gradually distanced themselves from the Swedish Social Democratic Party and even further from SSU, whose members often saw them as infiltrators. The newspaper, Offensiv, ran harsh criticism on the Social Democratic Party's policies, claiming that this party no longer represented the interests of the working class. Instead they started to promote the building of a new labour party to take this role.

In 1997, Arbetarförbundet Offensiv changed name to Rättvisepartiet Socialisterna (Socialist Justice Party or Justice Party - the Socialists) and began publishing Offensiv weekly instead of monthly.

Elections and breakaway

RS first won seats on the municipal council of Umeå in 1991, winning 3 seats. In 2002 the party had three seats in the municipal council in Umeå and also won two seats in Luleå.
In the 2006 elections, the RS won representatives in the municipal councils of Umeå (3 seats), Luleå (3 seats) and Haninge (2 seats). In 1994 RS won a seat in Västerbotten county council but upon re-election in 1998 failed to again reach the 3% threshold required for representation.

Before the 2010 elections, the party was divided between a national faction representing all but Västerbotten and a new party, Rättvisepartiet Socialisterna - enhetslista för jobb, mot nedskärningar (Socialist Justice Party - Unitary list for jobs, against cut-downs). RSE, unlike the mother party, did not campaign for the Riksdag but won one municipal council seat in Umeå (retained by an incumbent RS councillor). Consummating as well as simplifying the divisions, it was renamed the Workers' Party in 2011. In Haninge and Luleå the RS retained five seats with neither gains nor losses.

Campaigns

Kobane
RS have taken the initiative in organizing demonstrations in support of Kurds in the town of Kobane, Syria, besieged by the Islamic State.

Electoral results

Parliament

References

External links
Official Website
International Socialist Alternative website

1973 establishments in Sweden
Communist parties in Sweden
Far-left politics in Sweden
Political parties established in 1973
Sweden
Trotskyist organizations in Sweden